Frede Johansen is a Danish former professional darts player who competed in British Darts Organisation (BDO) events.

Johansen is a 4 times Danish Champion, who has been picked 24 times for the Danish national team which put him on the list as number 2, just after Stig Jørgensen.

He reached the semi final of the 2000 WDF Europe Cup, losing to the eventual winner Mitchell Crooks – he was also a member of the Danish team, who won the Team event and became overall champions at the 2008 WDF Europe Cup

In 2012, at the Nordic Championships, he won the pairs event together with Vladimir Andersen beating Daniel Larsson and Johan Engström from Sweden in the final

In 1999 he made one of only six Danish 9-darters during time.

External links 
 http://www.dartsdatabase.co.uk/PlayerDetails.aspx?playerKey=3305

Danish darts players
Living people
British Darts Organisation players
1969 births
People from Horsens
Sportspeople from the Central Denmark Region